Gabriel Montenegro Gutiérrez was a chemist, entrepreneur, and politician from El Salvador. He was also Secretary of the International Society of Naturopathic Physicians under Arthur Schramm (President), During the presidency of Carlos Humberto Romero He was fourth in line for the position of President of El Salvador.

Early life and family
Gabriel Montenegro Gutiérrez was born in Santa Ana, El Salvador to Gabriel Montenegro Soberón, a Guatemalan immigrant, and Eva Gutiérrez from Santa Ana, El Salvador.

He married Hilda Palomo Salazar, a Salvadoran socialite, daughter of Manuel Palomo Trabanino and María Elda Salazar Iraheta. The former was the eldest son of Dr. Manuel Palomo Cuellar, one of the founders of the Salvadoran Red Cruz, and Angela Trabanino González. Angela was the eldest daughter of José Antonio González Portillo, the mayor of Santa Tecla, El Salvador who served several terms. José Antonio was the right hand of his brother, Santiago González Portillo, President of El Salvador (15 April 1871 – 1 February 1876), and, the later, María Elda Salazar Iraheta, a first cousin of the famous Salvadoran artists Salarrue and Toño Salazar, since she was a was daughter Estaban Salazar Angulo and Matilde Iraheta, a daughter of the Salvadoran War Hero, General Francisco Iraheta Larreta.

Gabriel and Hilda had five sons: Ricardo Francisco Javier, Gabriel Ernesto, Fernando Rafael, José Eduardo and, Raul Antonio.

Education
After completing his formative years in El Salvador, He continued his education in Purdue University.

References

Purdue University alumni
1925 births
2014 deaths
Salvadoran expatriates in the United States